Alipurduar - Kamakhya Intercity Express is an intercity train of the Indian Railways connecting Alipurduar in West Bengal and Kamakhya in Assam. It is currently being operated with 15771/15772 train numbers on a daily basis.

Service

The 15771/Alipur Duar - Kamakhya Intercity Express has an average speed of 40 km/hr and covers 298 km in 7 hrs 10 mins. 15772/Kamakhya - Alipur Duar Intercity Express has an average speed of 40 km/hr and covers 298 km in 7 hrs 10 mins.

Route and halts 

Kamakhyaguri
Jorai
Gossaigaon Hat

Salakati

Bijni
Sarbhog
 
Sorupeta
Pathsala
Tihu

Coach composite

The train consists of 11 coaches :

 9 General
 2 Second-class Luggage/parcel van

Traction

Both trains are hauled by a New Malda Town Loco Shed based WDM-3A diesel locomotive.

External links 

 15771/Alipur Duar - Kamakhya InterCity Express
 15772/Kamakhya - Alipur Duar InterCity Express

References 

Rail transport in Assam
Transport in Guwahati
Intercity Express (Indian Railways) trains
Alipurduar railway division